Lawrence Monoson (born August 11, 1964) is a retired American film and television actor.

Career
Monoson's first film was the 1982 comedy The Last American Virgin, in which he starred as Gary. Other well-known film roles include the 1984 horror movie Friday the 13th: The Final Chapter as Ted Cooper, and the 1985 drama Mask as Ben. For his role in the HBO television film And the Band Played On, Monoson received a nomination as Best Supporting Actor in a Movie or Miniseries at the 1994 CableACE Awards.

Monoson starred in the short-lived (only two episodes were aired) 1997 TV series Prince Street. He had a recurring role on the series Resurrection Blvd. as Joey 'The Rock' Manelli, appearing in seven episodes during its first two seasons (2000 and 2001). Monoson also made guest appearances on episodes of a number of TV series, including Diff'rent Strokes, Beverly Hills, 90210, ER, NCIS, CSI: Crime Scene Investigation, 24, the Star Trek: Deep Space Nine 1993 episode "The Storyteller" and the Star Trek: Enterprise 2001 episode "Fortunate Son".

Monoson's last film role was in 2005's Guns Before Butter, while his last television role was in the 2010 episode "The 34th Floor" on the series CSI: NY.

Filmography

External links

1964 births
Living people
People from Yonkers, New York
LGBT people from New York (state)
Male actors from New York (state)
American male film actors
American male television actors
American gay actors